So Far So Good is a 2014 Italian comedy film directed by Roan Johnson.

The film premiered at the 2014 Rome Film Festival and won the audience award.

Cast
Alessio Vassallo as Vincenzo
Paolo Cioni as Cioni
Silvia D'Amico as Ilaria
Guglielmo Favilla as Andrea
Melissa Bartolini as Francesca
Isabella Ragonese as Marta
Marco Teti as Bernardini
Milvia Marigliano as Ilaria's mother
Mario Balsamo as Ilaria's father
Paolo Giommarelli as the professor

References

External links

2014 films
2010s Italian-language films
2014 comedy films
Italian comedy films
Films directed by Roan Johnson
Films shot in Tuscany
Films set in Pisa
2010s Italian films